A paper cut is a gap in skin opened by an edge of a piece of paper.

Paper Cut(s) or Papercut(s) also may refer to:

Music
 Papercut (artist), Greek musician and songwriter
 Papercuts (band), an American indie pop project
 Papercutz, a Portuguese electronic-music project
 Paper Cut, a chamber composition by Alex Shapiro

Songs
 "Paper Cut", by G Hannelius, 2012
 "Paper Cut", by Soilent Green from Confrontation, 2005
 "Paper Cut", by Tobin Sprout from Moonflower Plastic, 1997
 "Paper Cut", by Vanessa Hudgens from Identified, 2008
 "Paper Cuts", by Dave, 2019
 "Paper Cuts", by Nirvana from Bleach, 1989
 "Papercut" (Linkin Park song), 2001
 "Papercut" (Zedd song), 2015
 "Papercut", by Beans from Shock City Maverick, 2004
 "Papercut", by Fautline, 1998
 "Papercut", by Pistolita from Oliver Under the Moon, 2006
 "Papercut", by Roz Bell
 "Papercut", by the Summer Set from Love Like This, 2009
 "Papercuts" (Illy song), 2016
 "Papercuts" (Machine Gun Kelly song), 2021
 "Papercutz", by k-os from Joyful Rebellion, 2004

Television and radio
 Paper Cuts (audio drama), a 2009 audio drama based on the TV series Doctor Who
 Paper Cuts (radio show), a British show presented by Kate Thornton
 "Paper Cut", a character in the TV series The Adventures of Pete & Pete

Other uses
 Papercut, a webcomic by Michael Cho
 Papercutz (publisher), an American publisher of family-friendly comics and graphic novels

See also 
 Paper cut bug, in computing, any easily fixable but highly annoying usability bug
 The Papercut Chronicles, a 2005 album by Gym Class Heroes
 The Papercut Chronicles II, a 2011 album by Gym Class Heroes
 Papercuts Theater, a 2010 album by Burning Star Core
 Papercutting, the art of creating paper designs
 Paper cutter, an office tool to cut paper with a straight edge